Otto Huuhtanen (born 28 February 2000) is a Finnish footballer who plays for MP.

Career
At the age of 16, Huuhtanen signed for Newcastle United in the English Premier League after a trial.

For 2020, he signed for Finnish top flight side HIFK Fotboll.

In 2020, he signed for Myllykosken Pallo −47 in the Finnish second division.

In January 2021, Huuhtanen signed for FC Honka

In February 2022, Huuhtanen signed for MP for the 2022 season.

References

External links
 

2000 births
Footballers from Espoo
Living people
Finnish footballers
Finland youth international footballers
Association football goalkeepers
FC Ilves players
Newcastle United F.C. players
HIFK Fotboll players
Myllykosken Pallo −47 players
FC Honka players
JIPPO players
Mikkelin Palloilijat players
Veikkausliiga players
Ykkönen players
Kakkonen players
Finnish expatriate footballers
Expatriate footballers in England
Finnish expatriate sportspeople in England